Mena High School is an accredited public secondary school located in Mena, Arkansas, United States. The school provides comprehensive education to more than 550 students annually in grades nine through twelve. Mena High School is the largest of four public high schools in Polk County and is the sole high school administered by the Mena School District.

History
In 1975, two female students were expelled from Mena High School after spiking the punch at a party with two bottles of beer.  Feeling the punishment was excessive, the students took legal action, and the case was eventually heard by the Supreme Court of the United States, which ruled that school boards have a responsibility to assure that the constitutional rights of students are upheld.

Academics 
The assumed course of study for students is to complete the Smart Core curriculum developed by the Arkansas Department of Education (ADE), which requires students complete at least 22 units for graduation. Students complete regular (core and career focus) courses and exams and may select Advanced Placement classes and exams with opportunities for college credit via AP exam. As of 2008–09, Mena High School offered 14 programs of study in career and technical education in 12 career pathways as determined by the Arkansas Department of Career Education. The school is accredited by the ADE and has been accredited by AdvancED since 1930.

Fine arts
Students may participate in various musical and performing arts including: band (e.g., concert band, jazz band), choir (e.g., a cappella, barbershop quartet, beautyshop quartet) and theater (e.g., competitive speech, drama, stagecraft). Students may participate in Art Club. The high school conducts on and off campus performances including at Mena's Ouachita Little Theatre.

Athletics 
The Mena High School mascot is the Bearcat with the school colors of red and black.

For the 2012–14 seasons, the Mena Bearcats participate in the 4A Classification within the 4A Region 4 Conference as sanctioned by the Arkansas Activities Association with student-athletes competing in football, volleyball, baseball, basketball (boys/girls), cross country (boys/girls), bowling (boys/girls), cheer, golf (boys/girls), soccer (boys/girls), softball, tennis (boys/girls), track and field (boys/girls).

 Football: Home football games are played at Randall Whorton Field at Boyd Stadium. The Mena Bearcats won a state football championship in 1976, and were state runner up in 2014.

Notable alumni 
 Norris "Tuffy" Goff (1924)—Comedian in radio and film known for his portrayal of Abner Peabody on the rural comedy Lum and Abner.
 Chester Lauck (1920)—Comedian in radio and film known for his portrayal of Lum Edwards on the rural comedy Lum and Abner.

References

External links
 

1922 establishments in Arkansas
Educational institutions established in 1922
Public high schools in Arkansas
Schools in Polk County, Arkansas